"Walk Away from Love" is a song recorded by American singer David Ruffin in 1975. The million-selling single, produced by Van McCoy and written by Charles Kipps, was number one on the US R&B Singles Chart for one week in early 1976, and crossed over to #9 on the Pop Charts.  
In Canada, the song peaked at #30.

"Walk Away from Love" was Ruffin's only number-one R&B hit, and only one of two Top 10 pop hits for Ruffin on the Billboard Hot 100, the other being "My Whole World Ended (The Moment You Left Me)", which also peaked at #9. The song was his only solo entry into the UK charts, where it was a top ten hit as well, and peaked at #10 in early 1976. The backing vocals were performed by the disco group Faith, Hope & Charity.

See also
List of number-one R&B singles of 1976 (U.S.)
You Can't Walk Away From Love
Walk Away (disambiguation)

References

1975 singles
1975 songs
David Ruffin songs
Ken Boothe songs
Bitty McLean songs
Motown singles